John Osborne (1844 – April 23, 1920) was a United States Navy sailor and a recipient of the United States military's highest decoration, the Medal of Honor.

Biography
Born in 1844 in New Orleans, Louisiana, Osborne joined the Navy from that state. On that day, while Juniata was at Philadelphia, Pennsylvania, he rescued a young shipmate from drowning. For this action, he was awarded the Medal of Honor three days later, on August 24.

Osborne's official Medal of Honor citation reads:
Serving on board the U.S.S. Juniata, Osborne displayed gallant conduct in rescuing from drowning an enlisted boy of that vessel, at Philadelphia, Pa., 21 August 1876.

Osborne left the Navy while still at the rank of seaman. He died on April 23, 1920, at age 75 or 76 and was buried at Arlington National Cemetery in Arlington County, Virginia.

See also

List of Medal of Honor recipients during peacetime

References

External links

1844 births
1920 deaths
People from New Orleans
United States Navy sailors
United States Navy Medal of Honor recipients
Burials at Arlington National Cemetery
Non-combat recipients of the Medal of Honor